Jean Luc Mitana (born 29 September 1983), is a Rwandan filmmaker and cinematographer. He has served as a cinematographer in various films including Behind the Word, Kai the Vendor and Strength in Fear.

Personal life
He was born on 29 September 1983 in Kigali, Rwanda.

Career
In 2006, he joined Almond Tree Films Collective and in 2009, Mitana worked upon the film known as Maibobo which was directed by Yves Montand Niyongabo and  it was premiered at the Rotterdam International Film Festival in 2010. It was awarded at the 2011 Festival Cinema Africano d’Asia e America Latina in Milan, Italy.
He directed SAA-IPO in 2010. It was shot in Kigali and funded by Tribeca Film Institute. The film was  premiered at the 2011 Tribeca Film Festival and then screened at the 2011 Durban International Film Festival and AfryKamera International Film Festival, Poland in 2011. Then in 2014, he worked in the documentary Behind the World directed by Marie-Clementine Dusejambo. In 2014, he attended the Berlinale Talents, where he was part of the Editing Studio.

Filmography

References

External links
 
 Musanze to host inaugural Kaci Kaci Art Festival
 Filmmaker Isaac Chung, Rwanda, and the Perils of Patrimony

Living people
Rwandan film directors
Rwandan film producers
1983 births
People from Kigali